Andrea Danyell Kelly (née Lee, January 28, 1974),  known professionally as Drea, is an American choreographer, dancer, and actress. She is the ex-wife of singer-songwriter R. Kelly.

Background and personal life 
Andrea Danyell Lee was born in Chicago, Illinois on January 28, 1974.

In 1996, Drea, then aged 22, married singer–songwriter R. Kelly in Colorado. Prior to their marriage, Drea was a backup dancer for Kelly. Together Drea and Kelly have three children: daughters Joann (b. 1998), Jaah (b. 2000) and son Robert Jr. (b. 2002). Drea changed her last name from Lee to Kelly. Drea filed a restraining order against Kelly in September 2005 after he assaulted her when she told him she wanted a divorce. Kelly filed for divorce from Lee in 2006; it was finalized in 2009, both parties signed a NDA and Lee was given an undisclosed amount of money for alimony.

In 2014, Drea married 36-year-old barber and R&B singer Brian McKee, whom she divorced after just two months of marriage after allegations surfaced that he was having an affair.

In 2018, Drea revealed on The View that R. Kelly emotionally and physically abused her throughout their marriage. She stated the abuse became so severe that she contemplated suicide. Drea detailed an incident where Kelly assaulted her in the back of his Hummer, and as a result she suffers from PTSD. Another time, Kelly "hogtied" her in bed, raped her, and fell asleep while she was still tied. She stated her motive for speaking out many years after their divorce is to help other victims of domestic violence.

Filmography

Film

Television

Videography

Cameo appearances

Books

References

External links
 

1974 births
American film actresses
Living people
Actresses from Chicago
Dancers from Illinois
People with post-traumatic stress disorder
21st-century American women